Erick Kolthoff-Caraballo (born September 15, 1961 in San Juan, Puerto Rico) is an associate justice of the Supreme Court of Puerto Rico.

He obtained a bachelor's degree in business administration from the Interamerican University of Puerto Rico, an M.A. in Criminal Justice (with Summa-laude qualification) from the same institution, and the Juris Doctor degree from the University of Puerto Rico School of Law, where he graduated in 1988.

Prior to being appointed on February 4, 2009 to the Supreme Court by Governor Luis Fortuño he had been appointed by former Governor Aníbal Acevedo Vilá as a Superior Court judge, for which he was unanimously confirmed by the Senate.  Previously, he served as staff director of the Senate of Puerto Rico's Nominations Technical Evaluation Unit, as an attorney for the Courts Administration of Puerto Rico, the Puerto Rico Telecommunications Regulatory Board, and an attorney in private practice.  He is the son of a former Superior Court judge, his namesake, appointed in 1969 by then Governor Luis A. Ferré.

He is the son of Erick Kolthoff-Benners, the first Afro-Puerto Rican member of the islands' judiciary.

See also
 List of Hispanic/Latino American jurists
 List of Puerto Ricans
 German immigration to Puerto Rico

References

1961 births
Living people
Associate Justices of the Supreme Court of Puerto Rico
Hispanic and Latino American judges
Interamerican University of Puerto Rico alumni
Puerto Rican judges